Raúl Fernando Guerrón Méndez (born 12 October 1976) is an Ecuadorian retired football defender. For the entirety of his career he has played for Deportivo Quito.

He played for the Ecuador national football team and was a participant at the 2002 FIFA World Cup.

He is the older brother of Ecuador international footballers Joffre Guerrón and Hugo Guerrón.

References
RSSSF

1976 births
Living people
People from Atuntaqui
Association football defenders
Ecuadorian footballers
Ecuador international footballers
2001 Copa América players
2002 CONCACAF Gold Cup players
2002 FIFA World Cup players
S.D. Quito footballers
Barcelona S.C. footballers
C.D. Universidad Católica del Ecuador footballers